Northside East Bay  is a community in the Canadian province of Nova Scotia, located in the Cape Breton Regional Municipality on Cape Breton Island. The location of Northside East Bay is flawed on the current map. Northside East Bay is actually located on the most Easterly end of the Bras d'or Lakes; about 15 miles west of the city of Sydney.

References
Northside East Bay on Destination Nova Scotia

Communities in the Cape Breton Regional Municipality
General Service Areas in Nova Scotia